Thomas Nelson House is a historic home located at Peekskill, Westchester County, New York. It was built about 1860 and is a two-story, frame dwelling with a slightly hipped roof in the Italianate style. It has a two-story rear wing. It is clad in clapboard and sits on a stone and brick foundation.  It features a one-story, open front porch with scrolled brackets, paired posts, and bracketed eaves.  Also on the property is a contributing well house.

It was added to the National Register of Historic Places in 2001.

References

Houses on the National Register of Historic Places in New York (state)
Italianate architecture in New York (state)
Houses completed in 1860
Houses in Westchester County, New York
Buildings and structures in Peekskill, New York
National Register of Historic Places in Westchester County, New York